Gargiulo is an Italian surname from Southern Italy, primarily Naples, but also common in South America, especially Argentina. A small number of Gargiulo's change the spelling to Corjulo when they immigrated to the United States.

Origin and derivation 
Though very common there, it is not specific to Naples: it is the 11th most common surname in the Region of Campania, which was 9.5% of the population of Italy in 1980, and Naples made up at that time only roughly 23% of the population of Campania. The surname was extremely common in both Naples and the Sorrentine area quite early, and is well documented in church records in the end of the 16th century. In Sorrento alone there was an estimated minimum Gargiulo population of 500 at any one time in the 17th century based on a 2008 study of at least 600 Gargiulo church records from 8 area churches. For such a large Gargiulo community to have existed in the Sorrentine area in the 17th century, it is estimated that the surname must already have been in common usage there in the 16th century before the commencement of church records ca. 1580, and probably also as early as the 15th century. The same could almost certainly also be documented for the same period for Naples and the surrounding area.

However, there is no known source for this pure speculation: the exact origin of the surname and when it first came into common usage is not presently known, and it is perhaps derived from Gargiu or from the common Roman family name Gargilius (as many surnames in Campania are derived from Roman ones). The best known Roman of this name today was Quintus Gargilius Martialis, a soldier, Roman official, and writer on medical subjects, though not a physician; a lot is known about him because of the admiration for his medical writings in the Middle Ages.

It is unusual that so many in the Sorentine surroundings (and Naples) were already using the Gargiulo surname in 1600, since ordinary people in other parts of Europe had not yet started using surnames at this early time.  However, Romans commonly did use 2 names, and even 3, which could help explain the early use of 2 and 3 names in southern Italy.  However, so far no connection between Gargiulo and Gargilius has been documented.

Variations
Garguilo
Gargulio
Gargiula
Gargiullo
Gurgiolo
Cargiulo

Noted individuals surnamed Gargiulo
 Antonino Bonaventura Gargiulo (1848–1904), monsignor, editor, publisher and Bishop of San Severo
 Domenico Gargiulo, Baroque painter (1612–1679), better known as Micco Spadaro
 Julian Gargiulo, Italian-American concert pianist
 Lou Gargiulo, two-term member of the New Hampshire House of Representatives
 Michael Gargiulo, serial killer from Santa Monica, California
 Michael Gargiulo (journalist), television news anchor
 Rafael Gargiulo, Argentina's 1960 and 1964 Summer Olympics light-heavyweight boxer

Gargiulo Family Businesses
Gargiulo's Italian Restaurant
Gargiulo Vineyards
Gargiulo Brothers Oil

References